Juan Carlos Mariño Márquez (born 2 January 1982 in Lima) is a former Peruvian footballer who played primarily as an attacking midfielder. He is currently head coach of Deportivo Llacuabamba's reserve team.

International career
He has made 22 appearances for the Peru national football team.

Mariño made his debut as a substitute during his first Peru cap in the opening match vs Uruguay in the first round of the Copa America 2007, scoring a goal. Mariño scored his second international goal against Colombia on June 14, 2008.
He also played for Hércules in Spain.

Coaching career
On 21 January 2018, Mariño was appointed head coach of Cantolao's reserve team and technical assistant for the first team. On 28 October 2018, he was promoted to joint-head coach for the clubs first team alongside Jorge Araujo for the rest of 2018. However, the duo was only in charge for six games before the club confirmed, that Araujo would continue as the clubs head coach, while Mariño would keep going with the reserve team.

In January 2020, he moved to Deportivo Llacuabamba as head coach of the clubs reserve team.

International goals

Honours

Club
Sporting Cristal
Torneo Descentralizado: 2012

References

External links

1982 births
Living people
Footballers from Lima
Peruvian footballers
Association football midfielders
Peru international footballers
Peruvian expatriate footballers
Academia Deportiva Cantolao players
Expatriate footballers in Argentina
Club Atlético Lanús footballers
Peruvian expatriate sportspeople in Argentina
Argentinos Juniors footballers
Expatriate footballers in Albania
FK Dinamo Tirana players
Peruvian expatriate sportspeople in Albania
Cienciano footballers
Club Alianza Lima footballers
Expatriate footballers in Spain
Hércules CF players
Peruvian expatriate sportspeople in Spain
Cádiz CF players
Expatriate footballers in Colombia
Atlético Nacional footballers
Peruvian expatriate sportspeople in Colombia
Deportivo Cali footballers
Sport Boys footballers
Sporting Cristal footballers
Querétaro F.C. footballers
Juan Aurich footballers
León de Huánuco footballers
Argentine Primera División players
Peruvian Primera División players
Liga MX players
Categoría Primera A players
2007 Copa América players